DBB or dBB can mean several things:

 Daigasso! Band Brothers, a music video game
 Dasmariñas Bagong Bayan, a public housing project in the Philippines
 Davis Brody Bond, an American architectural firm
 dB(B), a former sound level unit
 De Broglie–Bohm theory, an interpretation of quantum theory
 Deep Banana Blackout, an American jazz-funk band
 Design–bid–build, a project delivery method
 Deutsche Bundesbahn (German Federal Railway), state railway system of Germany
 Deutsche Bundesbank, Germany's central bank
 Deutscher Bandy-Bund (German Bandy Federation), a German sports governing body
 Deutscher Beamtenbund (German Civil Service Federation), a trade union for German government employees
Deutscher Brauer-Bund, a German federation
 Don Bosco Bandel, a Catholic boys' school in Bandel, India
 "Duffle Bag Boy", a song by Playaz Circle
 El Alamein International Airport (IATA: DBB), in El Dabaa, Matrouh Governorate, Egypt 
 German Union of Building Trades, former trade union in Germany